Sir Andrew Ferguson, 1st Baronet (7 October 1761 – 17 July 1808) was an Anglo-Irish banker and politician.

Ferguson was High Sheriff of Londonderry City in 1786 and Mayor of Derry City from 1796 to 1797. He was the Member of Parliament for Londonderry City in the Irish House of Commons between 1798 and the Acts of Union 1800. On 7 October 1801 he was made a baronet, of the City of Londonderry in the Baronetage of Ireland. 

Ferguson married Elizabeth, daughter of the Derry merchant Robert Alexander, who was the brother of the James Alexander, 1st Earl of Caledon. He was succeeded in his title by his son, Robert Ferguson.

References

1761 births
1808 deaths
18th-century Anglo-Irish people
19th-century Anglo-Irish people
Baronets in the Baronetage of Ireland
High Sheriffs of Londonderry City
Irish MPs 1798–1800
Members of the Parliament of Ireland (pre-1801) for County Londonderry constituencies